The Botanical Gardens at Asheville (BGA), also known as the Asheville Botanical Gardens, is an independent non-profit botanical garden located on 10 acres at 151 W. T. Weaver Boulevard in Asheville, North Carolina. Dedicated to the study and promotion of the native plants and habitats of the Southern Appalachians, the garden is open daily with free admission for all. Support for maintenance of the garden comes primarily from memberships, donations, and the work of volunteers.

The BGA was established in 1961 on eroded, abandoned timberland. Cleanup and trail-building took place from 1962 to 1963, and planting started in 1964 following an overall design by Doan Ogden, a nationally known landscape architect. At that time more than 5,000 plants were transplanted into the garden from private lands and national forests. Although the BGA is located on land belonging to the adjacent University of North Carolina at Asheville, the BGA operates independently and is overseen by a Board of Directors elected from and by the general membership of the Botanical Gardens.

Today the BGA includes more than 650 species of plants native to the southern Appalachian Mountains.

See also 
 List of botanical gardens in the United States

External links 

 Botanical Gardens at Asheville
University of North Carolina Asheville website

Botanical gardens in North Carolina
Culture of Asheville, North Carolina
University of North Carolina at Asheville
Protected areas of Buncombe County, North Carolina
Tourist attractions in Asheville, North Carolina